Spitboy was an American anarcho-punk band founded in the San Francisco Bay area in 1990. The all-female band aggressively criticized patriarchy and gender roles but did not associate with the contemporaneous riot grrrl movement. They released several records and toured extensively and then disbanded in 1995. Members later played in the bands Instant Girl and Aus Rotten, while drummer Michelle Cruz Gonzales and vocalist Adrienne Droogas have been active as writers.

History
Spitboy was founded by drummer Michelle "Todd" Gonzales, vocalist Adrienne Droogas, bassist Paula Hibbs-Rines, and guitarist Karin Gembus. Paula left the band before the release of the Rasana 7-inch EP and was replaced by Dominique Davison.

The band toured the United States, Europe, Australia, New Zealand, and Japan.  Their records were released on prominent punk rock labels Lookout Records, Allied Recordings, and Ebullition Records, including a split LP with the Chicago-based hardcore group Los Crudos.

After the breakup of the group, Davison, Gonzales, and Gembus played together in the group Instant Girl, whose sound was less aggressive than that of Spitboy.  Instant Girl released an LP on Allied Recordings.  Droogas was briefly a member of the group Aus Rotten and then moved to Richmond, Virginia. She also wrote columns for the punk zines Heartattack and Profane Existence. Davison is now an architect and owner of Draw in Kansas City. Gonzales teaches English at Las Positas College in Livermore, California, has published zines and memoirs on her time in Spitboy.

In April 2021, it was announced that the band would be releasing their complete discography as a new compilation, Body of Work (1990-1995), released by Don Giovanni Records on June 25. The first single, "What Are Little Girls Made Of?", was released in May 2021.

Legacy
The band had a large impact and fans included fellow musicians Alice Bag and Billie Joe Armstrong of Green Day as well as members of Operation Ivy, Fugazi, Neurosis, and Citizen Fish.

Discography
The Threat Sexism Impressed b/w Ultimate Violations  7-inch (Lookout Records 51) - 1991
True Self Revealed LP (Ebullition Records) - 1993
Mi Cuerpo Es Mio 7-inch (Allied Recordings) - 1994
The Spitboy CD (Allied Recordings) - 1994 - Contains the first two singles and the LP
Rasana 7-inch - (Ebullition Records) - 1995
Split LP with Los Crudos (Ebullition Records) - 1995
Body of Work (1990-1995) (Don Giovanni Records) - 2021

References

External links
Spitboy fan page on Myspace

All-female punk bands
Anarcho-punk groups
Hardcore punk groups from California
Don Giovanni Records artists